Emanuela Brizio (born 10 September 1968) is an Italian female sky runner who won two Skyrunning World Cups (2009, 2010).

Biography
She started with the mountain running in 1999, at the age of 31, is considered among the greatest skyrunners of all-time, still active and winning at the threshold of 40 years, the Aquila di Aurano (Aurano's Eagle), as she is nicknamed, boasts its rich palmarès two World Cups (Skyrunner World Series) and 10 national titles at individual level.

Achievements

World Cup wins

National titles
Italian Skyrunning Championships 
Overall: 2006, 2007, 2008, 2010 (4)
SkyRace: 2011, 2014, 2015 (3)
SkyMarathon: 2011, 2015 (2)
Ultra SkyMarathon: 2013 (1)

Wins
 Sentiero 4 Luglio SkyMarathon
 Half marathon: 2003
 Marathon: 2004, 2005, 2009, 2011, 2012, 2014, 2015 (7)

Other results

 2003:
 1st, Mezzalama Skyrace
 2004:
 1st, Zegama-Aizkorri, Spain
 1st, Valposchiavo-Valmalenco, Italy
 2005:
 1st, Valmalenco-Valposchiavo, Spain
 2009:
 1st, Irazú SkyRace, Costa Rica
 1st, Maratòn Alpina Zegama-Aizkorri, Spain
 1st, Vallnord SkyRace, Andorra
 1st, Mount Kinabalu Climbathon, Malaysia
 2010:
 1st Trofeo Kima

References

External links
Emanulela Brizio profile at Sport di montagna

1968 births
Living people
People from Verbania
Italian female ski mountaineers
Italian female mountain runners
Italian sky runners
Sportspeople from the Province of Verbano-Cusio-Ossola